Show Me The Buffet is stand-up comedian John Pinette's first comedy album.  It is a recording of a performance in Vernon Hills, Illinois.

Track listing
"Weight Watcher Friends" – 1:46
"Halloween" – 1:36
"The Great Meat Recall" – 2:23
"Disneyworld In August / The Character Buffet" – 3:53
"All You Can Eat" – 2:16
"Grab and Move" – 1:55
"The Wonderful Wizard Of Oz Buffet" – 2:37
"Chinese Buffet/You Go Now" – 3:28
"Japanese Food/Free Willy" – 6:07
"The Water Park, The Slide & The Tube" – 7:42
"Bungee Jump" – 0:53
"World Hunger" – 2:03
"Send'um Wheat" – 1:24
"Indian Food" – 1:30
"Sonna a Formato" – 2:50
"A Gas Problem" – 1:57
"When the Spice Hits" – 1:47
"Chipmunk Funk" – 1:28
"Elvis" – 1:06

References

1998 live albums
John Pinette albums
1998 debut albums